Kingarth is a historic village and parish on the Isle of Bute, off the coast of south-western Scotland. The village is within the parish of its own name, and is situated at the junction of the A844 and B881. In the Early Middle Ages it was the site of a monastery and bishopric and the cult centre of Saints Cathan and Bláán (Anglicized: Blane).

St Blane's Church and monastery

Located to the north of Kilchattan Bay, Kingarth was the central religious site for the Cenél Comgaill kindred of Dál Riata (after which Cowal is named), just as Lismore was for the Cenél Loairn and Iona for the Cenél nGabráin.

The ruins of St Blane's Church are surprisingly extensive, situated in a sheltered hollow near the top of a south facing slope. The site has views south to the Isle of Arran and Holy Island. Most of the remains, of the nave and part of the chancel, date from the 1100s. In the 1300s the chancel was enlarged; the east end of the church is less well constructed than the remaining parts. There is a finely-carved Romanesque chancel arch. In the grounds are the remains of a well and the foundations of a manse, which was still in use in the 16th century.

There are upper and lower churchyards, where men and women respectively were buried; both have a large number of fairly worn grave slabs, one or two of which have traces of decoration. In the lower churchyard there are the remains of another building thought to have been of a small chapel. In the upper churchyard is a hogback tombstone, often wrongly said to mark the tomb of St Blane, and which dates to the 900s or 1000s. It shows that the Norsemen who settled here, after the monastery was abandoned, eventually became Christians themselves. The upper churchyard contains the graves of 7th- and 8th-century bishops and abbots. There is also the family plot of Sir William Macewen (1848-1924), the notable surgeon who lived at nearby Garrochty.

The centre for Saint Bláán's cult had probably moved to the mainland to Dunblane in Strathearn under the influence of Viking attacks in the 9th century, perhaps like the movement of the relics of Saint Cuthbert to the bishopric of Lindisfarne and those of Saint Columba to the bishopric of Dunkeld. Despite this, it survived as a religious site to become one of only two parish churches on the island, the other being Rothesay; it was part of the diocese of the Isles, though perhaps originally in the diocese of Argyll. Alan fitz Walter tried to grant the church to Paisley Abbey in 1204, but this grant does not appear to have been effective and it remained an independent parsonage until the 15th century. In 1463 it became a prebend for the newly created chapter of the diocese of the Isles, but in 1501 it was annexed to the Chapel Royal at Stirling, becoming in 1509 a prebend for the chancellorship of the Chapel Royal, the latter arrangement surviving beyond the Scottish Reformation.

See also
 List of known bishops of Cenn Garad

References

External links

Canmore - Bute, Kingarth Church site record
Kingarth parish has a prominent and well maintained War Memorial that records the names of all those in the Parish who made the ultimate sacrifice during the First World War, and the Second World War

Christianity in medieval Scotland
History of Scotland by location
Villages on the Isle of Bute
Parishes in the County of Bute